The Transylvanian Plain is an ethnogeographical area in Transylvania, Romania, located between the Someșul Mare and the Someșul Mic rivers to the north and west and the Mureș River to the south and east. It is populated by both ethnic Romanians and ethnic Hungarians.

The Transylvanian Plain can be divided into two parts: a hilly one in the northeast and a flatter one in the south and west.

Important villages in the Transylvanian Plain include Sic (in Hungarian, Szék; a former salt-mining town), Mociu (Mócs), Jucu (Zsuk), Band (Mezőbánd), Suatu (Magyarszovát), and Unguraș (Bálványosváralja).

Images 

Geography of Transylvania
Geography of Cluj County
Plains of Romania
Carpathians